Pažiť is a village and municipality in Partizánske District in the Trenčín Region of western Slovakia.

History
In historical records the village was first mentioned in 1351.

Geography
The municipality lies at an altitude of 200 metres (656.2 feet) and covers an area of 3.062 square kilometres (1.903 square miles). It has a population of about 403 people.

References

External links

 
https://web.archive.org/web/20080111223415/http://www.statistics.sk/mosmis/eng/run.html 

Villages and municipalities in Partizánske District